Festival Nacional Afrocaribeño (National Afro-Caribbean Festival) is an annual cultural celebration held at Ángel “Cuqui” Mangual baseball field in the La Cuarta neighborhood of Barrio Capitanejo in Ponce, Puerto Rico. The celebration, which commonly lasts three days, takes place in late June. It has been called "a world-class" event that brings together "the best exponents of salsa, bomba, plena and merengue music". It is attended by some 30,000 people. The festival's purpose is to positively impact the region by creating a cultural space to help preserve traditions. It aims to highlight the contributions to Puerto Rico culture and society by Puerto Ricans of African heritage. The festivities are highlighted by bands playing salsa, bomba and plena music.

History
The festival was organized in the late 1990s to counter raising criminal activity in the community of La Cuarta, and to help improve the self-esteem of its residents. "From those humble beginnings" the community "is now a place that smells like tradition." The community of "La Cuarta" is located at the border between Ponce and Juana Diaz. It was founded in the early 20th century next to a sugar cane mill that is now extinct.

Contents and purpose
Festival Nacional Afrocaribeño is organized and held by Comité Pro Nuestra Cultura. Its leader is Ángel ‘Papote’ Alvarado Aguilera. Over 20 artists participate during the event's three days' duration. The event's purpose is to promote the Afro-Puerto Rican and Afro-Caribbean roots of the Puerto Rican people while contributing to the educational and social of growth of the community. Another objective is to "break the social stigma that exists against underpriviledged communities."

Some of the musical groups that have participated in the past include Tommy Olivencia and his band, El Gran Combo, La Sonora Ponceña, Gilberto Santa Rosa, Victor Manuel, and Plena Libre.

Finances and cost
The event is free to the public, but a voluntary donation of $1 is encouraged. The entity that organizes the event used to receive a contribution from the Ponce and Juana Diaz municipal governments but, as of 2017, such allowances were halted due to the financial crisis those governments were experiencing. The 2016, and last, contribution form the Ponce Municipal Government was 5% of the total cost of the event.

List of events
A typical music lineup is as follows (this was the music lineup for the 2017 event):

Friday: 

8:00 p.m.: Secreto a Voces
9:00 p.m.: Tego Calderón
11:00 pm.: Plenéalo

Saturday: 
8:30 p.m.: Bomba Evolución
9:30 p.m.: Homenage to Giovanni Hidalgo y José Mañengue Hidalgo
10:00 p.m.: Grupo Esencia
11:00 p.m.: La Sonora Ponceña

Sunday: 
4:00 p.m.: Isabel Albizu Bomba School
6:00 p.m.: Bomba IYA
7:00 p.m.: Homenage to La Cuarta's Past Musicians
7:30 p.m.: Guayacanes de San Antón
8:30 p.m.: Homenage to Ángel “Cholo” Espada
9:30 p.m.: Tommy Olivencia

See also
 Feria de Artesanías de Ponce
 Ponce Jazz Festival
 Fiesta Nacional de la Danza
 Día Mundial de Ponce
 Festival Nacional de la Quenepa
 Bienal de Arte de Ponce
 Festival de Bomba y Plena de San Antón
 Carnaval de Vejigantes
 Fiestas patronales de Ponce

Notes

References

External links
 Ramon Marin. Las Fiestas Populares de Ponce. Editorial Universidad de Puerto Rico. 1994. 

Carnivals in Puerto Rico
Festivals in Ponce, Puerto Rico
Events in Ponce, Puerto Rico
Food and drink festivals in Puerto Rico
Cultural festivals in Puerto Rico
Folk festivals in Puerto Rico